Bente Christina Brønnum Scavenius (born 12 December 1944, in Stockholm) is a Danish art historian, art critic and author. She has taught at the University of Copenhagen and Aarhus University, and has written more than 20 books. She has also been a member of numerous public and private committees and boards of directors of cultural institutions in Denmark.

She is the daughter of land owner Carl Christian Brønnum Scavenius, who owned Klintholm Gods, and a relative of former Prime Minister Erik Scavenius. She is married to actor Joen Bille (of the noble Bille family), who is a son of Irene Ibsen Bille and a descendant of Henrik Ibsen, Sigurd Ibsen and Bjørnstjerne Bjørnson. She is the mother of actress Beate Bille.

Scavenius has a mag.art. degree in history of art.

Honours and awards 

 2012 – Order of the Dannebrog
 2004 – N. L. Høyen Medal
 2003 – Ingeniør B Sunds kulturpris
 2002 – Ole Haslunds Hæderslegat
 1997 – Den Danske Publicistklubs jubilæumslegat
 1998 – Ørelæge Valdemar Klein og Hustru Læge Johanne Kleins Legat
 1995 – Møn-Prisen
 1994 – Denmark's candidate for Europe's Women's Prize
1992 – Rosenkjærprisen
 1991 – H.K.H. Prinsens Fond
 1984 – Ole Haslunds Kunstnerfond

Bibliography

Books 

Den lille billedkunst
Hammershøis København
Verdenskunst i Danmark
Danmarks dejligste haver

References 

Danish art historians
People from Møn
1944 births
Living people
Women art historians
Danish women historians
Scavenius family